Paleontological Site Jazigo Cinco is located in the city of Santa Maria, Rio Grande do Sul, Brazil. And belongs to Santa Maria Formation. It is located in the neighborhood Kilometro 3 near Castelinho, is to 2.7 kilometers away from the Paleontological Site Arroio Cancela. It belongs to UFSM (Federal University of Santa Maria) and is a center of research. It is the place where he was collecting the Staurikosaurus, the first Brazilian dinosaur. Site belongs to the region paleorrota.

See also
Paleorrota Geopark
Paleontology

Paleontological sites of Brazil
Santa Maria, Rio Grande do Sul
Mesozoic paleontological sites of South America
Triassic paleontological sites

References